The  is an electric multiple unit (EMU) train type operated in Japan by the private railway operator Hankyu since 1980.

Overview 
The 7000 series were built between 1980 and 1988 by Japanese rolling stock manufacturer Alna Koki. This type is the most common in the Hankyu fleet at 210 cars. 

The trains are based on the previous 6000 series. In addition, the 7300 series are a derivative of the 7000 series.

Formations

8-car sets 
As of November 2020, there are 19 eight–car sets enrolled in the roster. 16 sets are allocated to Kobe line services while three sets are set aside for service on the Takarazuka Line.

 The "Mc" and "M" cars are fitted with two scissors-type pantographs.

Kobe Line 8–car mixed 7000/8000 series sets 
In June 2019, set 8042 was transferred over to Kobe Line operations and attached to 6-car set 7001.

Takarazuka Line 8–car mixed 7000/8000 series set 
In 2016, two–car sets 7025 and 7026 and four–car set 7024 underwent inspection. In April 2017, two–car set 7025 was connected to two 6000 series cars and transferred to Nose Electric Railway as a four-car formation leaving 7024 and 7026 as a six–car set along with 8000 series two-car set 8030. Later in August, two–car set 7026 was divided from the train along with two-car set 8030. The resulting trainset is a 2–2–4 set with two-car sets 8040 and 8041 and four-car set 7024.

Kobe Line 4–car set 
In March 2016, two-car sets 7034 and 7035 were combined to make a semi–permanent four–car train.

Takarazuka Line 4–car set 
In August 2019, two-car 7031 was connected to two cars formerly belonging to Kobe line set 6050 to form a four–car set for the Minoo Line.

Nose Electric Railway 4–car set

2–car sets 

 The "Mc" car is fitted with two scissors-type pantographs.

Interior 
Passenger accommodation consists of longitudinal seating throughout. Paneling inside the car is composed of a light-brown faux wood finish.

Kyo-Train "Garaku" 
On May 22, 2018, Hankyu announced that they would be introducing a second train to their Kyo-Train lineup. It would be composed of six-car set 7006. The train was named the "Kyo-Train Garaku" in December of that year and entered service a month after that. This set has the middle door removed on all cars, effectively making it two doors per side per car.

Nose Electric Railway 7200 series 
As of April 2020, two four-car sets operate for Nose Electric Railway as 7200 series.

Gallery

References 

Electric multiple units of Japan
7000 series
Train-related introductions in 1980
1500 V DC multiple units of Japan